Fort Sam Houston Independent School District is a public school district based in San Antonio, Texas (United States).

History
The district was formed in 1951 and opened for class in September 1952 for the purpose of serving the children of military personnel residing on Fort Sam Houston and Camp Bullis; previously, the children were assigned to surrounding districts.  Initially only grades 1-6 were offered, but in 1961 construction began on a junior/senior high school to offer secondary education (grades 7-12) on post.  The 6th grade was later moved to the junior/senior high school and the PK and kindergarten grades later added.

Eligibility 
Currently, only students whose parents physically reside on either Fort Sam Houston or Camp Bullis have automatic right to attend Fort Sam Houston ISD schools; students whose parents are assigned to either installation, but reside off-post, can be accepted as transfer students, but the parents must provide transportation.

Jurisdiction
Fort Sam Houston ISD is not part of the Department of Defense Education Activity school system; it is an independent school district subject to the jurisdiction of the Texas Education Agency.  It is one of three school districts in the state whose boundaries are coterminous with a military installation; the other two (also in the San Antonio area) are Randolph Field and Lackland.  As the district's boundaries are coterminous with those of Fort Sam Houston, the facilities of which by law are exempt from property taxation, the district has no taxable base; thus, funding is provided from U.S. Department of Education Impact Aid funds and state public school foundation funding.

Schools 
 Robert G. Cole Junior-Senior High School (Grades 6-12)
 Fort Sam Houston Elementary School (Grades PK-5)
 National Blue Ribbon School in 1993-94

References

External links 
 Fort Sam Houston ISD
 Fort Sam Houston

School districts in Bexar County, Texas
School districts in San Antonio
School districts established in 1951
Joint Base San Antonio